Clayton Townsend (born February 9, 1961) is an American film producer, television producer and production manager.
Between 1988 and 1999 he collaborated intensively with director Oliver Stone as (co-)producer and associate producer. Notable movies from that period are Born on the Fourth of July (1989), Natural Born Killers (1994) and Any Given Sunday (1999). Other notable producer achievements are Abel Ferrara's The Blackout (1997) and Where's Marlowe? (1998), directed by Daniel Pyne. He also served as an executive producer on the MGM comedy Heartbreakers (2001), directed by David Mirkin, and on Bad Company (2002), from director Joel Schumacher. In addition to feature films, Clayton has produced several television pilots for Paramount Television, including the 2003 telefilm Homeland Security.

In 1990, Townsend won the Directors Guild of America Award for Outstanding Directorial Achievement in Motion Pictures for the film Born on the Fourth of July. He shared this award with Oliver Stone. In 2012 Clayton was nominated for the Producers Guild of America Award as Outstanding Producer of Theatrical Motion Pictures for Bridesmaids. Since 1992 he is president of Itinerant Film Corporation, a private production company based in Los Angeles.

Selected filmography

Feature films

Television
 Homeland Security (2004, pilot episode)
 Sleepy Hollow (2013, pilot episode)
 Scorpion (2014, 1 episode)

References

External links
 

1952 births
Living people
Businesspeople from Los Angeles
Film people from Los Angeles
Film producers from California
Television producers from California